Tupper Lake is a lake in New York in the United States.  The lake is in the Adirondack Park and crosses the county lines of St. Lawrence County and Franklin County.

Tupper Lake was discovered by Native Americans indigenous to the area around the 16th century. The first European to see it was Ansel Tupper, a land surveyor. It is aligned in a northeast to southwest direction along its length.  The lake is fed and drained by the Raquette River.

The lake is located in the towns of Altamont (Franklin County) and Piercefield (St. Lawrence County). The Village of Tupper Lake is at the northeast end of the lake in the Town of Tupper Lake.  The village is adjacent to Raquette Pond,  an arm of the lake at its northwest end.  Another arm of the lake, Lake Simond (also known as Simond Pond and Simon Pond), is south of the village. Some of the islands in the lake include County Line Island and Bluff Island.

References 

Lakes of New York (state)
Lakes of Franklin County, New York
Lakes of St. Lawrence County, New York
Tourist attractions in Franklin County, New York
Tourist attractions in St. Lawrence County, New York
Adirondack Park